The Libyan Division I Basketball League (LBL) is the highest tier professional basketball league in Libya. It is organized by the Libyan Arab Basketball Federation.

Teams
Al Ittihad Tripoli
Al Ahly Tripoli
Al Shabab
Al Nasr Benghazi
Al Ahly Benghazi
Al Wehda
Al Hilal
Al Madina Tripoli
Al Morog
Aljazeera
Al-Yarmouk
Al Tahhadi

Champions

See also
Libyan Cup
Libyan Super Cup

External links
Afro-Basket.com League Page

 
Basketball competitions in Libya
Basketball leagues in Africa